John Vance Tanner (March 8, 1945 – February 5, 2009) was a gridiron football linebacker, defensive end and tight end who played in the National Football League and the Canadian Football League. He played college football and basketball at Tennessee Tech.

Early life and military service
Tanner was born in Orlando, Florida and grew up in Cocoa, Florida. He attended Cocoa High School, where he was a member of the basketball team, but did not graduate because was expelled two weeks before graduation in 1963 after an altercation with a teacher. Tanner enlisted in the US Army and was deployed to Vietnam.

College career
After being discharged from the Army, Tanner enrolled at Brevard Junior College, where he played basketball. After finishing his two years at Brevard he moved on to play basketball at Tennessee Tech University. As a senior he also joined the football team, despite not having played the sport in high school, and became a two-way starter at defensive end and tight end and was named the Golden Eagles' most valuable player.

Professional career
Tanner was selected in the ninth round of the 1971 NFL Draft by the San Diego Chargers. He played both tight end and defensive end as a rookie, playing in all 14 of the Chargers' games with three starts and catching one pass for six yards. Tanner was signed by the Toronto Argonauts of the Canadian Football League (CFL) in 1972. He was signed by the New England Patriots in 1973. Tanner started at outside linebacker for the first two games of the 1974 season, but lost his starting spot to George Webster after missing a game due to a shoulder injury. He occasionally played tight end and caught two passes for 23 yards, including a two-yard touchdown reception against the Baltimore Colts on November 24. Tanner was the first primarily defensive player to score a touchdown on offense in Patriots history and the only player to do so until Mike Vrabel did so in 2002. He was cut by the Patriots during training camp in 1975. Tanner returned to the CFL with the Montreal Alouettes in 1976.

Post-football life
After retiring from football, Tanner worked for USBI Co. Tanner died of cancer on February 5, 2009.

References

1945 births
2009 deaths
American football linebackers
Tennessee Tech Golden Eagles football players
New England Patriots players
San Diego Chargers players
Montreal Alouettes players
Toronto Argonauts players
Players of American football from Florida
Eastern Florida State College people
Tennessee Tech Golden Eagles men's basketball players
American football defensive ends
American football tight ends
United States Army personnel of the Vietnam War
Canadian football defensive linemen
Deaths from cancer in California